Adem Kubilay Somyurek (born 25 September 1967 in Izmir, Turkey) is an Australian politician. He has served as a member of the Victorian Legislative Council currently representing the Northern Metropolitan Region.

Somyurek was a member of the Australian Labor Party (ALP) until 2020, when he was expelled to sit as an independent. He served twice as a government minister, as Minister for Small Business, Innovation and Trade in the First Andrews Ministry from 2014 to 2015 and as Minister for Local Government and Minister for Small Business in the Second Andrews Ministry from 2018 to 2020.

In June 2020, Somyurek became the subject of major corruption allegations including branch stacking during the 48th Victorian Parliament.

Personal life
Born in 1967 in Izmir, Turkey, Somyurek moved to Australia with his parents when he was 18 months old. Prior to entering the Victorian Parliament, Somyurek worked as a taxi driver, as a staffer for Labor Senator Jacinta Collins in 1996 and later in the office of federal MP Anthony Byrne.

Somyurek holds a Master of Arts in Policy and Politics, a Bachelor of Arts in Politics and Sociology and an Associate Diploma in Business Studies (Accounting).

Political career
Somyurek first entered parliament after winning the Legislative Council province of Eumemmerring at the 2002 election. Somyürek made his inaugural speech to the Victorian Legislative Council as the new member for Eumemmerring on 27 February 2003. After the reforms that introduced proportional representation into the Legislative Council, Somyurek won a safe spot on the Labor ticket for the South Eastern Metropolitan Region and was easily re-elected at the 2006 election. Somyurek was elected in the 2010 and 2014 State elections.

In his first term (2002–2006) Somyurek served on the Outer Suburban and Interface Committee, and the Public Accounts and Estimates Committee. In his second term (2006–2010) Somyurek was elected the first chair of the newly constituted Electoral Matters Committee but lost the position in December 2009 as a result of being convicted for driving while disqualified. The conviction brought to light that Somyurek had been driving whilst disqualified for at least 12 months prior to this conviction, the original disqualification resulting from losing all demerit points on his license for a variety of driving offences.

In his third term (2010–2014) Somyurek was promoted into the Shadow Ministry of the Daniel Andrews-led Labor opposition. Upon election to his fourth term (2014–2018) and the election of the Labor Party in Victoria, Somyurek was sworn in as Minister for Small Business, Innovation, and Trade.

Somyurek stood down from his ministerial role in May 2015 following allegations of inappropriate behaviour, and later resigned on 28 July 2015 after an investigation by the Secretary of the Department of Premier and Cabinet found he had bullied his chief of staff, Dimity Paul. He was succeeded by Philip Dalidakis in the Andrews Ministry.

At the 2018 Victorian election Somyurek was returned to his seat in the Upper House. On 27 November 2018 Premier Daniel Andrews announced that Somyurek would be rejoining the Cabinet in the new Andrews Ministry. On 29 November 2018 it was revealed that Somyurek was to handle the portfolios of Local Government and Small Business within the re-elected Andrews Government.

In November 2022, Somyurek announced he had joined the Democratic Labour Party, and ran as a candidate for that party in the Northern Metropolitan Region. Somyurek subsequently won a seat.

The Age/Nine recordings
On 14 June 2020, The Age and Nine Network released covert recordings purporting to show Somyurek organising branch stacking. In its investigation, Somyurek is alleged to have registered local party members with false details, taking funds from business owners to pay for party membership fees, and directing ministerial staffers with branch stacking activities.

Included in the numerous covert recordings, are several sections where Somyurek is heard making derogatory comments towards MPs Gabrielle Williams and Marlene Kairouz and ministerial staffers, which have been described as sexist and homophobic.

Following the release of the recordings, on 15 June 2020, Premier Andrews sacked Somyurek from his cabinet and referred Somyurek's conduct to Victoria Police and the Independent Broad-based Anti-corruption Commission for further investigation. Andrews also wrote to the National Executive of the Australian Labor Party (ALP) to seek the termination of Somyurek's party membership. Later that day, the Labor Party's national president, Wayne Swan, confirmed that Somyurek had resigned his membership, adding that Labor's National Executive Committee had taken further steps to ensure there would "never be a place for Somyurek in the ALP ever again".

IBAC investigation
Somyurek was a target of Operation Watts, an investigation by Victoria's Independent Broad-based Anti-corruption Commission (IBAC). He has been a person of interest into matters around allegations of branch stacking in Victoria.

IBAC held public hearings during October 2021 into allegations of serious corrupt conduct involving Victorian public officers, including Members of Parliament. The hearings are part of Operation Watts, a coordinated investigation between IBAC and the Victorian Ombudsman, which is looking into a range of matters including allegations of 'branch stacking' aired in media reports in 2020.

On the first day of hearing on 11 October 2021, federal Labor MP and former ally of Somyurek Anthony Byrne claimed that Somyurek "had been coercing staff for at least two years and had threatened to "take people out" of pre-selections.

References

External links
 Parliament of Victoria – Legislative Council – The Hon Adem Somyurek MP
 Parliamentary voting record of Adem Somyurek at Victorian Parliament Tracker

|-

1967 births
Living people
Australian Muslims
Members of the Victorian Legislative Council
Members of the Victorian Legislative Council for Eumemmerring Province
Members of the Victorian Legislative Council for South Eastern Metropolitan Region
Australian Labor Party members of the Parliament of Victoria
Democratic Labor Party (New) members of the Parliament of Victoria
Independent members of the Parliament of Victoria
Labor Right politicians
Politicians from Melbourne
Australian people of Turkish descent
Turkish emigrants to Australia
People from İzmir
Monash University alumni
Deakin University alumni
21st-century Australian politicians